For the public library in the city of Newport, South Wales see Newport Central Library

The Newport Public Library was charted by the State of Rhode Island in 1869. The Library opened on May 4, 1870, as “The People’s Library of Newport.”

History

The library's first home was the Rhode Island Union Bank building on Thames Street. The library moved to the Edward King House in 1914. In October 1968, the library moved to its present location on Spring Street.

Description
Located in historic Newport, Rhode Island, the public library is housed in a building that sits at the bottom of Aquidneck Park on Spring Street, just east of Newport Harbor.  The public library offers the community a collection of materials and services, for adults, children, and teens that are both current and classic.

Services
Library services include:
 Lending books, audiobooks, DVDs, CDs, magazines and other library materials
 Downloadable audiobooks and ebooks
 Library of Things (telescope, sewing machine, serger, analog converters)
 Interlibrary loans
 Public computers with Internet access, as well as WiFi connectivity
 Programming for children, teens, and adults
 A discount bookstore with books, CDs and DVDs

See also
List of libraries in Rhode Island

References

Libraries in Rhode Island
Buildings and structures in Newport, Rhode Island
Education in Newport County, Rhode Island
Public libraries in Rhode Island
Tourist attractions in Newport, Rhode Island
1869 establishments in Rhode Island
Libraries established in 1869